Xinhua Yi and Miao Ethnic Township is a township of Fengqing County in western Yunnan province, China, located about  northeast of the county seat and  due north of Lincang as the crow flies. , it has 11 villages under its administration.

References 

Township-level divisions of Lincang
Miao ethnic townships
Yi ethnic townships